Deutsche Telekom AG (short form often just Telekom, DTAG or DT; stylised as ·T·) is a German telecommunications company that is headquartered in Bonn and is the largest telecommunications provider in Europe by revenue. Deutsche Telekom was formed in 1995 when Deutsche Bundespost (at that time a monopoly under state ownership) was privatized. Since then, Deutsche Telekom has featured among Fortune 500 companies, with its latest ranking at number 62 (in 2022). The company operates several subsidiaries worldwide, including the mobile communications brand T-Mobile.

As of April 2020, the German government holds a 14.5% stake in company stock directly, and another 17.4% through the government bank KfW. The company is a component of the EURO STOXX 50 stock market index.

History 
The Deutsche Bundespost was the federal German government postal administration created in 1947 as a successor to the Reichspost. It was also the major telephone company in West Germany.

On 1 July 1989, as part of a post office reform, Deutsche Bundespost was split into three entities, one being Deutsche Telekom. On 1 January 1995, as part of another reform, Deutsche Bundespost Telekom became Deutsche Telekom AG, and was privatized in 1996. As such, it shares a common heritage with the other privatized Deutsche Bundespost companies, Deutsche Post (DHL) and Deutsche Postbank.

Deutsche Telekom was the monopoly Internet service provider (ISP) for Germany until its privatization in 1995, and the dominant ISP thereafter. Until the early 21st century, Deutsche Telekom controlled almost all Internet access by individuals and small businesses in Germany, as they were one of the first German telecom units.

On 6 December 2001, Deutsche Telekom became the first official partner of the 2006 FIFA World Cup.

On 1 January 2005, Deutsche Telekom implemented a new company structure. The two organizational business units of T-Com and T-Online were merged into the Broadband/Fixed Network (BBFN) strategic business unit (T-Online merged with parent Deutsche Telekom in 2006). It provides around 40 million narrowband lines, over 9 million broadband lines, and has 14 million registered Internet customers.

In 2008, the structure was changed again. T-Online was separated from Deutsche Telekom and merged with T-Com to form the new unit T-Home. In September 2010, Orange parent France Télécom and T-Mobile parent Deutsche Telekom merged their operations in the United Kingdom to create the largest mobile network in Britain, EE.

In April 2010, T-Mobile was merged with T-Home to form Telekom Deutschland GmbH. This unit now handles all products and services aimed at private customers. In October 2012, Deutsche Telekom and Orange created a 50-50% joint venture named BuyIn for regrouping their procurement operations and benefiting from economies of scale.

In April 2013, T-Mobile US and MetroPCS merged their operations in the United States. In February 2014, Deutsche Telekom acquired the remaining parts of its T-Mobile Czech Republic division for around €800 million. The size of the remaining stake was numbered at 40 percent.

In December 2014, it was announced that Deutsche Telekom were in talks with BT Group on the acquisition of EE, and part of the deal was to provide Deutsche Telekom a 12% stake and a seat on the board in the BT Group upon completion. BT Group announced agreement in February 2015 to acquire EE for £12.5 billion and received regulatory approval from the Competition and Markets Authority on 15 January 2016. The transaction was completed on 29 January 2016.

In September 2015, Deutsche Telekom launched the "Puls tablet", a Tablet computer with Android version 5.

In February 2016, at the Mobile World Congress, in Barcelona, Deutsche Telekom jointly launched the Telecom Infra Project (TIP) with Intel, Nokia, Facebook, Equinix, SK Telecom, and others, which builds on the Open Compute Project model to accelerate innovation in the telecom industry.

In February 2020, Deutsche Telekom joined a new partnership called HAPS Alliance to promote the use of high altitude vehicles in the Earth's stratosphere with the goal of eliminating the digital divide.

On April 1, 2020, Sprint completed the merger with T-Mobile US, making T-Mobile US the owner of Sprint and becoming its subsidiary until the Sprint brand is phased out. The merger also led to SoftBank Group, the then-owner of Sprint to hold up to 24% of New T-Mobile's shares while Deutsche Telekom holds up to 43% of its shares. The remaining 33% is since held by public shareholders.

In September 2021, Deutsche Telekom sold T-Mobile Netherlands for €5.1 billion to the investment companies Apax Partners and Warburg Pincus.

Finances 
For the fiscal year 2017, Deutsche Telekom reported earnings of €3.5 billion, with an annual revenue of €74.9 billion, an increase of 2.5% over the previous fiscal cycle. Deutsche Telekom's shares traded at over €14 per share, and its market capitalization was valued at US$68.4 billion in November 2018.

Operations 
Deutsche Telekom also holds substantial shares in other telecom companies, including Central European subsidiaries Slovak Telekom (Slovakia), Magyar Telekom (Hungary). Furthermore, Magyar Telekom holds majority shares in Makedonski Telekom (North Macedonia), and Hrvatski Telekom (Croatia) holds majority shares in Crnogorski Telekom (Montenegro).

DT also holds shares in the Hellenic telecommunication operator OTE, which also have shares in several other companies like Telekom Romania and the IT&C retailer Germanos. Deutsche Telekom also operates a wholesale division named International Carrier Sales & Solutions (ICSS) that provides white label voice and data solutions to large carriers including T-Mobile. OTE also used to have shares in One Telecommunications operating in Albania. Prior to its sale it was known as Telekom Albania using DT's logo and marketing strategies.

Operation of telephone companies involves billing-software or "BSS". Deutsche Telekom's T-Mobile billing was performed on Israeli-backend systems until 2014, when Ericsson was selected to replace the Israeli backend.

T-Systems 

T-Systems sells worldwide products and services to medium to very large business customers. The focus is on the marketing of complex services and industry solutions.

Deutsche Telekom Global Carrier 

Deutsche Telekom Global Carrier is formerly known as Deutsche Telekom International Sales and Solutions. It is an international wholesale arm of Deutsche Telekom. The products include Voice Termination, Ethernet, IP-Transit, Mobile and Roaming as well as In-flight Internet Access for the aviation industry. It operates a Tier-1 network.

European Aviation Network 

Together with Inmarsat and Nokia, Deutsche Telekom develops a hybrid network for faster internet access on board the planes in Europe. It is a combination of data transmission via Inmarsat Satellite and Deutsche Telekom's LTE ground stations throughout the European continent.

Controversy  
In November 2019, Deutsche Telekom was part of a controversy when word came out it had sued Lemonade Insurance, a New York-based company, for their use of the color magenta. Deutsche Telekom argued that the use of the color magenta by Lemonade Insurance (and similar looking variations of the color) violated one of their trademarks. The lawsuit was reported by multiple online sources and eventually picked up on social media. Lemonade Insurance started an online campaign called #freethepink to gain support for using the color magenta.

Amid concerns over Chinese involvement in 5G wireless networks in Europe, Deutsche Telekom temporarily put all deals to buy 5G network equipment on hold in 2019, as it awaited the resolution of a debate in Germany over whether to ban Chinese vendor Huawei on security grounds.

See also 
Deutsche Telekom eavesdropping controversy

References 

 
German brands
Telecommunications companies of Germany
Telecommunications companies established in 1995
Companies based in Bonn
German companies established in 1995
1996 initial public offerings
Companies listed on the Frankfurt Stock Exchange
Multinational companies headquartered in Germany
Companies in the Euro Stoxx 50
Government-owned companies of Germany
Tier 1 networks
Companies in the TecDAX
Softbank portfolio companies